Paul O'Neill (born 31 December 1979) is a British auto racing driver, and the half-brother of English singer Melanie C.

Career

Early years
Born in Widnes, Cheshire, O'Neill was originally attracted to racing after seeing Nigel Mansell win the 1987 British Grand Prix, but did not pursue a career initially, studying for A-Levels but not completing them. After attending the Jim Russell racing school, he began racing in the MGF cup in 1999 and 2000, before entering the production class of the British Touring Car Championship in 2001. He did not win a race, but took 3 class podiums and 2 class poles en route to 8th in the class.

British Touring Car Championship

Vauxhall (2002–2003)
His efforts in the production class were enough to earn him a drive with Team Egg Sport in their semi-works Touring Class Vauxhall Astra Coupe for 2002. He was 8th in this championship, and then stepped up to the factory Vauxhall team for 2003, finishing 4th in the series.

Tech-Speed and Motorbase (2004–2007)
He was not expected to retain the drive for 2004, but early that year he discovered that he had diabetes, and his racing licence was temporarily withdrawn. Once the condition was under control he did not immediately resume racing, instead helping his former team Tech-Speed prepare their bio-ethanol powered car, tutoring driver Fiona Leggate and fulfilling the post of race engineer. He also raced the guest car in the Porsche Carrera Cup at Oulton Park in 2006 along with some Ginettas Racing.

Following Leggate's premature departure from Tech-Speed, O'Neill signed for the team to compete in the final two race weekends of the 2006 British Touring Car Championship season. This car is powered by sugar beet, which he is not permitted to eat because of his diabetes. He scored a 10th place in his first race back. Notably, while most drivers at this September Brands Hatch meeting were slower than they had been at the April meeting due to different track conditions, O'Neill was over a second faster than Leggate's time from that meeting in some practice sessions. At Silverstone he was hampered by engine issues in practice but took 2 top 10 finishes on raceday. He did not keep the drive for 2007, Techspeed opting instead to unite with the Turkish Arkas team and run Erkut Kızılırmak. He competed in the final round of 2007 with Motorbase Performance in a SEAT Toledo.

Tech-Speed (2009–2011)

O'Neill returned to Tech-Speed for the 2009 British Touring Car Championship season, partnering Martyn Bell in a two-car team. He scored a third place at Snetterton, and as of round seven at Knockhill he had scored points in 11 successive races. He was placed 10th in the Drivers Championship.

O'Neill remained with Tech-Speed for the 2010 & 2011 seasons, now joined by John George. He finished 9th (2010) and 10th (2011) claiming 5 podiums.

Speedworks Motorsport (2012)
He was without a regular drive at the start of the 2012 season, but drove the Speedworks Motorsport Toyota Avensis at Croft and Knockhill, deputising for the team's regular driver Tony Hughes, who was unable to take part due to his business commitments. He was unable to secure the finances required to stay with the team for 2013.

Tony Gilham Racing (2013)
Having been without a drive since the start of the 2013 season, O'Neill joined Tony Gilham Racing for the Knockhill round driving an RCIB Insurance Racing Vauxhall Insignia when regular driver Jack Goff decided to miss the round.

British GT Championship
O'Neill entered the Croft round of the British GT Championship towards the end of 2007 alongside co-driver Steve Clark in a Team RPM Viper Competition Coupe GT3. He returned to the series in 2008 with Team RPM driving a Viper Competition Coupe in the GT3 class. He competed in the first eight races of the season, including a win in the second race at Rockingham. He finished the season 16th in the GT3 standings.

Other activities
O'Neill is currently a motor racing instructor at the Oulton Park circuit in Cheshire.

Since 2012, he has been part of the presenting team for the ITV4 television coverage of the BTCC.

In 2013 he appeared on the British television series Top Gear, driving a Volkswagen Beetle in a taxi race.

In 2014, he appeared in series 2 of Classic Car Rescue, driving and valuing the restored cars. He also competed in one round of the Mazda MX-5 SuperCup at Oulton Park, taking two wins.

Paul O'Neill is a Patron of The Sporting Memories Foundation and on 10 September 2017 completed the Great North Run to raise funds for the charity.

O'Neill is also a driver coach for Britcar class champion Tim Docker. O'Neill volunteered as a marshal at the seventh round of the Britcar Endurance Championship at Oulton Park.
O'Neill was the driver of the car for a new world record set by golfer Marcus Armitage for the longest drive into a moving car.

Paul is the co-founder of 29 Productions - a bespoke multi camera streaming and production company.

Racing record

Complete British Touring Car Championship results
(key) Races in bold indicate pole position (1 point awarded – 2001–2002 all races, 2003–present just for first race, 2001 in class) Races in italics indicate fastest lap (1 point awarded all races, 2001 in class) * signifies that driver lead race for at least one lap (1 point given – 2001–2002 just for feature race, 2003–present all races, 2001 in class)

Complete British GT Championship results
(key) (Races in italics indicate fastest lap in class)

References

External links
OwyRacing, Paul O'Neill's official website
Article on Carrera drive
BTCCpages profile

British Touring Car Championship drivers
English people of Irish descent
1979 births
Living people
British GT Championship drivers
Porsche Carrera Cup GB drivers
Sportspeople from Widnes
People with type 1 diabetes
Ginetta GT4 Supercup drivers
Mini Challenge UK drivers
24H Series drivers